WBTY (98.7 FM) is a radio station broadcasting a classic hits format. It is licensed to Homerville, Georgia, United States. It is currently owned by Southern Broadcasting & Investment Co., Inc. and features programming from CNN Radio and Westwood One.

References

External links

BTY
Classic hits radio stations in the United States
Radio stations established in 1989